The 55th Infantry Regiment was a regular infantry regiment in the United States Army.

Lineage
Constituted 15 May 1917 in the Regular Army as the 55th Infantry. Organized 16 June 1917 at Chickamauga Park, Georgia from personnel of the 17th Infantry. Assigned to the 7th Infantry Division 16 November 1917. Inactivated 22 September 1921 at Camp Meade, Maryland. Disbanded 31 July 1922.

Reconstituted in the regular Army as the 55th Armored Infantry and assigned to the 11th Armored Division 9 June 1942. Activated 15 August 1942 at Camp Polk, Louisiana. Regiment broken up 20 September 1943, and elements reorganized and redesignated as elements of the 11th Armored Division as follows:
 55th Armored Infantry (less 1st 2nd, and 3rd Battalions) as the 55th Armored Infantry Battalion
 1st Battalion as the 63rd Armored Infantry Battalion
 2nd Battalion as the 21st Armored Infantry Battalion
 3rd Battalion disbanded

Campaign streamers
World War I
 Lorraine 1918

Coat of arms
This regiment was organized in 1917 from personnel of the 17th Infantry which is shown in the canton. The division of which this regiment formed a part was engaged on the outer defenses of Metz, and about to make another attack when the Armistice was signed. The shield of Metz is divided per pale silver and black and the crest is the Napoleonic eagle on a mural crown. This regiment first entered the lines in the vicinity of Pont-à-Mousson, the arms of which bear a bridge of three arches flanked by two towers; the center arch is broken to symbolize the partial destruction of the bridge at the time the regiment was there.

References

External links
 http://www.history.army.mil/html/forcestruc/lh.html
 http://www.11tharmoreddivision.com/history/55th_AIB.html

055
Military units and formations established in 1917
1917 establishments in Georgia (U.S. state)
United States Army regiments of World War I